Dirty Looks is the fifth solo album by the American country pop singer Juice Newton. It was released by Capitol Records in 1983.

Overview
Dirty Looks was Newton's follow-up to Juice (her "breakthrough" album) and  Quiet Lies.  Both  had been major hits for Capitol and, between them, had produced six top ten singles. With their success, Capitol seemed determined more than ever to push Newton further into the pop market. Dirty Looks was not as successful as Juice and Quiet Lies and produced only three modest hits. "Tell Her No", a reworking of The Zombies's 1965 top ten hit, peaked at number 27 on the Billboard Pop chart while "Dirty Looks" only reached number 90. "Stranger at My Door" had a modest peak at number 45 on the Billboard Country chart.

In summing up the album's modest success, the music critic Ian McFarlane noted, "The first clue was the album cover which featured a series of nine photos of Juice looking bright, playful and not a little coy, whereas with previous covers (Juice and Quiet Lies in particular) she’d radiated a quiet confidence and sheer determination by staring straight at the camera lens. The second clue was the preponderance of synthesizer arrangements and big crashing guitar chords among the songs written by rock and pop based performers such as Van Stephenson ("Dirty Looks"), Rod Argent ("Tell Her No") and Marc Jordan ("Slipping Away"). Even the usually restrained Otha Young seemed to be working the big pop riffs with "Don't Bother Me".

Despite this, Dirty Looks sold well enough in Canada to be certified Gold on October 13, 1983. On June 26, 2007 Dirty Looks and a later Newton album, Old Flame, were released on a "2 for 1" compact disc. The closing track on the album, "For Believers", was later reused with a new recording for Newton's 2007 album, The Gift of Christmas.

Critical reception
People called the album a "bumper crop of delightful tunes."

Track listing

Personnel

Juice Newton – lead vocals
Vinnie Colaiuta, Rick Shlosser, Rick Marotta – drums
Neil Stubenhaus – bass guitar
George Doering, Hugh McCracken, Mark Goldenberg, Fred Tackett – electric guitar
Fred Tackett, George Doering, Otha Young – acoustic guitar
Doug Livingston – pedal steel
Randy Kerber – piano
David Foster, Phil Aaberg – piano and Fender Rhodes
Jim Lang – organ
Michael Boddicker, Vince DiCola – synthesizer
Michael Casey Young, Jim Lang, Otha Young – synthesizer programming
Tom Scott – flute and lyricon solo
Dave Boruff – saxophone
Steve Forman, Richard Landis – percussion
Tommy Funderbunk, Tom Kelly and Timothy B. Schmit; Maxine Waters, Clydene Waters and Julia Jackson; Richard Landis, Juice Newton and Johnny Pierce – backing vocals

References

1984 albums
Juice Newton albums
Albums produced by Richard Landis
Capitol Records albums